The 2011 Lagos State gubernatorial election was the 7th gubernatorial election of Lagos State. Held on 26 April 2011, the Action Congress of Nigeria nominee Babatunde Fashola won the election, defeating Shamsideen Adegboye of the People's Democratic Party.

Results 
A total of 15 candidates contested in the election. Babatunde Fashola from the Action Congress of Nigeria won the election, defeating Shamsideen Adegboye from the People's Democratic Party. Valid votes was 1,862,513.

References 

Lagos State gubernatorial elections
Lagos gubernatorial
April 2011 events in Nigeria